Carl Joseph Begas, or Karl Begas, (30 September 1794, Heinsberg – 24 November 1854, Berlin) was a German painter who played an important role in the transition from Romanticism to Realism. He was the first in a multi-generational "dynasty" of artists.

Life and work
His family (originally "Begasse") came from Belgium, in the region near Verviers and Liège. He was the third child of Franz Anton Begasse (1764–1842), a judge, and his wife, Susanne née Hoffstadt. In 1802, they moved to Cologne, where he received his first artistic training from the miniaturist, . Later, he studied at the Lyceum in Bonn with Clemens August Philippart (1751–1825). In 1813, he went to Paris, where he became a student of Antoine-Jean Gros. While there, shortly after the Battle of Paris, his talent was noticed by King Friedrich Wilhelm III, who bought one of his works and became his patron. He remained in Paris until 1821. His first works dealt exclusively with Christian themes.

A scholarship made it possible for him to live in Italy from 1822 to 1825. There, he became associated with the Nazarene movement, and first began to sign his name as "Begas". In 1825, he moved to Berlin and married Wilhelmine Bock, daughter of the Master Builder, Johann Ludwig Bock. After that, he devoted himself primarily to portraits. Their home soon became a meeting place for Berlin's "high society". The following year, he was named a Professor at the Prussian Academy of Arts; a position he held until his death. Joseph Petzl was one of his best known students.

Around 1828, he came under the influence of the Düsseldorfer Malerschule and began to create works with historical and literary references, but always went back to portrait painting, largely for economic reasons.  When the civilian order, Pour le Mérite, was established in 1843, he was commissioned to paint portraits of the medals' recipients, including the sculptors, Christian Daniel Rauch and Johann Gottfried Schadow, the philologist, Jakob Grimm, and the naturalist, Alexander von Humboldt. In 1846, King Friedrich Wilhelm IV appointed him Court Painter.

He died in 1854, at the age of sixty, after returning from a visit to Rome. Four of his sons also became artists.

His children 

Oskar Begas (1828–1883) portrait painter and professor at the Prussian Academy of Arts.
 (1830–1860) officer.
Reinhold Begas (1831–1911) sculptor, head of the Siegesallee project.
Hellmuth Begas (1833–1893) officer.
Veronika Begas (1834–1844) 
Adalbert Begas (1836–1888) painter, specializing in genre scenes.
Susanne Begas (1839–1848)
Karl Begas (1845–1916) sculptor.

Sources
 Hans Mackowsky, "Begas, Karl (Joseph)", In: Allgemeines Lexikon der Bildenden Künstler von der Antike bis zur Gegenwart, Vol. 3: Bassano–Bickham, Wilhelm Engelmann, Leipzig, 1909 (Online)
 
 Rita Müllejans-Dickmann, Dorothee Haffner, Udo Felbinger: Carl Joseph Begas (1794–1854). Blick in die Heimat, Exhibition catalog, Heinsberg, 1994

External links

 
 Begas-Haus Homepage
 Biography and references @ the Portal Rheinische Geschichte

1794 births
1854 deaths
19th-century German painters
German male painters
Nazarene painters
German romantic painters
Court painters
Pupils of Antoine-Jean Gros
Academic staff of the Prussian Academy of Arts
German people of Belgian descent
People from Heinsberg
19th-century German male artists